Air Florida Commuter was the regional feeder network for Air Florida. Air Florida Commuter was not an airline, but a system of affiliated commuter carriers that fed traffic into Air Florida's hubs. In an arrangement commonly known as code-sharing, each airline painted their aircraft in Air Florida aircraft livery and colors and their flights were listed in computer reservation systems as Air Florida flights.

History 
Air Miami became the first affiliate airline in 1980, and over a dozen other small airlines eventually became part of the system, including: Marco Island Airways, Florida Airlines, Key Air, Southern International Airways, Skyway of Ocala, North American Airlines, National Commuter Airlines, Gull Air, Pompano Airways, Finair Express, Slocum Airlines, Atlantic Gulf Airlines and others. As Air Florida became financially strapped, the commuter system was dismantled in early 1984.

Fleet 
The Air Florida Commuter fleet consisted of the following aircraft models and quantities:

See also 
 List of defunct airlines of United States

References

Defunct regional airline brands
Defunct airlines of the United States
Airlines based in Florida